is a Japan-exclusive multiplatform video game released from 1991 to 1993. It is based on the anime series Nadia: The Secret of Blue Water.

Versions

Family Computer
Fushigi no Umi Nadia (translated: Nadia of the Mysterious Seas) released 1991 by Toho for the Famicom console. Based on the characters from the NHK animated TV series of the same name.

The player controls a cast of characters in a simple looking strategy battle game. Battles are carried out through an RPG style turn based system.

Sega Mega Drive
Namco published an adventure game for the Sega Mega Drive. While it is viewed from an overhead 2D perspective, it is similar to a point-and-click adventure game. The player must talk to people and collect items to solve puzzles and advance through the game, but there are no combat elements to the game. There is a password feature to allow the player to resume from the beginning of each chapter.
This game was released on March 19, 1991.

The plot of the game mostly follows the outline of the original, but it diverges from the storyline in many ways.  The introductions of Marie, Gargoyle, Emperor Neo, and the climactic moments, for instance, are drastically different from the show.

Sharp X68000
Fushigi no Umi Nadia: The Secret of the Blue Water (Sharp X68000, October 23, 1992, developed and published by Gainax)

NEC PC-9801

FM Towns

PC Engine CD
Hudson Soft also published an adventure game for the PCE CD. It was released in 1993.

References

External links
Fushigi no Umi Nadia licensees at MobyGames
Reviews of Nadia The Secret of Blue Water and its sequels

1991 video games
1992 video games
1993 video games
Atlantis in fiction
FM Towns games
Gainax
Hudson Soft games
Japan-exclusive video games
Namco games
NEC PC-9801 games
Nintendo Entertainment System games
Sega Genesis games
X68000 games
Submarines in fiction
TurboGrafx-CD games
Video games based on anime and manga
Video games based on works by Jules Verne
Video games developed in Japan
Video games featuring female protagonists
Works based on Twenty Thousand Leagues Under the Sea